Mount Sloan is a  mountain summit located in British Columbia, Canada.

Description
Mount Sloan is the sixth-highest peak in the Thiassi Range which is a subrange of the Coast Mountains. Precipitation runoff from the peak drains north to Downton Lake which is a reservoir of the Bridge River. Mount Penrose rises to the north on the opposite side of the lake.

Etymology
The mountain was presumably named after David Sloan who was a mining engineer and managing director at the Pioneer Mine just east of Bralorne. He died on August 4, 1935, from injuries received in a floatplane crash at Alta Lake on July 30, 1935. The crash also took the lives of the pilot, William R. McCluskey, Reginald Walter Brock and his wife Mildred. The mountain's toponym was officially adopted September 6, 1951, by the Geographical Names Board of Canada.

Climate

Based on the Köppen climate classification, Mount Sloan is located in a subarctic climate zone of western North America. Most weather fronts originate in the Pacific Ocean, and travel east toward the Coast Mountains where they are forced upward by the range (Orographic lift), causing them to drop their moisture in the form of rain or snowfall. As a result, the Coast Mountains experience high precipitation, especially during the winter months in the form of snowfall. Winter temperatures can drop below −20 °C with wind chill factors below −30 °C.

See also

 Geography of British Columbia

References

External links
 Weather: Mount Sloan
 Mount Sloan Climbing: Mountainproject.com
 Tragic Crash on Alta Lake

Two-thousanders of British Columbia
Pacific Ranges
Lillooet Land District